Zorobabel Rodríguez Rodríguez (born 13 April 1902, date of death unknown) was a Chilean boxer who competed in the 1924 Summer Olympics. In 1924 he was eliminated in the first round of the lightweight class after losing his fight to the upcoming gold medalist Hans Jacob Nielsen.

References

External links
Profile

1902 births
Year of death missing
Lightweight boxers
Olympic boxers of Chile
Boxers at the 1924 Summer Olympics
Chilean male boxers
20th-century Chilean people